Croton phebalioides, is a shrub endemic to northern Australia, from Central New South Wales to Cape York Peninsula.

The plant grows as a shrub, 3–4 metres in height, with narrow, strongly discolourous leaves approximately 5 cm in length. The upper leaf is a light to glaucous green, the lower leaf appears silver-white or brown due to a dense covering of scales. The natural habitat of Croton phebalioides is monsoon forest, rainforest and vine thickets, usually in hills of mountains.

References 

phebalioides
Flora of Queensland
Flora of New South Wales
Taxa named by Ferdinand von Mueller
Taxa named by Johannes Müller Argoviensis